Cyanogaster noctivaga is a species of characin native to the Rio Negro, Brazil. This species is the only known member of its genus and its scientific name translates as the blue-bellied night wanderer, referring to its unique appearance and nocturnal habits. It was first described in 2013, having been discovered in October 2011 on a scientific expedition organised by the University of São Paulo, Brazil.

Description
When alive, Cyanogaster noctivaga is a transparent fish with a blue belly and reddish gill covers, but it quickly loses its bright colours after death. Its eyes are large, and the shape of its snout and its dentition differs from other characins, marking it out as a new genus.
It differs from other members of the subfamily Stevardiinae in having 8 dorsal-fin rays and four teeth in the inner premaxillary tooth series and i+5 pelvic-fin rays and the presence of a single conical tooth in the outer premaxillary tooth series. There are hooks on the rays of the pelvic and anal fins in mature males.

Distribution and habitat
This fish is only known from a single location in the Rio Negro, but as it is a very small fish and seems to be entirely nocturnal, it is easily overlooked. It was found in an acidic backwater, a similar habitat to that of the smallest known species of fish, Paedocypris progenetica, which occurs in peaty forest swamps and blackwater streams in Asia.

References

Characidae

Fish described in 2013